Gamma Sagittae, Latinized from γ Sagittae, is the brightest star in northern constellation of Sagitta. A single star, it is visible to the naked eye with an apparent visual magnitude of +3.47. Based upon an annual parallax shift of 12.62 mas as seen from Earth, it is located about 288 light-years from the Sun. It is moving closer to the Sun with a radial velocity of −34 km/s.

This is a red giant star with a stellar classification of M0 III. It is most likely (94% chance) on the red-giant branch of its evolutionary lifespan, fusing hydrogen along a shell to generate energy. The star is around 2.35 billion years old with roughly 55 times the Sun's radius. Mass estimates range from 0.9 to 1.8 times the mass of the Sun. It is radiating about 562 times the Sun's luminosity from its enlarged photosphere at an effective temperature of 3,862 K.

Naming

References

External links

M-type giants
Suspected variables
Sagittae, Gamma
Sagitta (constellation)
Durchmusterung objects
Sagittae, 12
189319
098337
7635